Spargania is a genus of moths in the family Geometridae erected by Achille Guenée in 1857.

Species
Spargania aurata (Grote, 1882)
Spargania bellipicta Warren, 1901
Spargania luctuata (Denis & Schiffermüller, 1775) – white-banded carpet
Spargania magnoliata Guenée, 1857
Spargania viridescens (Grossbeck, 1910)

References

Larentiini